Hakob Ter-Petrosyan (born 31 August 1971) is a retired Armenian football midfielder.

References

1971 births
Living people
Armenian footballers
FC Armavir (Armenia) players
FC Ararat Yerevan players
FC Yerevan players
Association football midfielders
Armenia international footballers
Soviet footballers
Soviet Armenians